The 2011 Tennis Napoli Cup was a professional tennis tournament played on clay courts. It was the 15th edition of the tournament which was part of the 2011 ATP Challenger Tour. It took place in Naples, Italy, between 18 and 24 April 2011.

Singles main draw entrants

Seeds

 Rankings are as of 11 April 2011.

Other entrants
The following players received wildcards into the singles main draw:
  Jérémy Chardy
  Enrico Fioravante
  Thomas Muster
  Matteo Trevisan

The following players received entry from the qualifying draw:
  Enrico Burzi
  Pavol Červenák
  Daniel Smethurst
  Michael Yani

Champions

Singles

 Thomas Schoorel def.  Filippo Volandri, 6–2, 7–6(4)

Doubles

 Travis Rettenmaier /  Simon Stadler def.  Travis Parrott /  Andreas Siljeström, 6–4, 6–4

External links
Official Website
ITF Search
ATP official site

Tennis Napoli Cup
2011 in Italian tennis
Tennis Napoli Cup